Stamatis Katsimis (born May 30, 1982 in Greece) is a Greek racing driver. He has raced in junior motorsport category for most of his racing career, before driving in the 2008 Superleague Formula season for Olympiacos CFP in the final rounds.

Racing record

Superleague Formula
(key) (Races in bold indicate pole position) (Races in italics indicate fastest lap)

References

External links
 Driver Database information

Greek racing drivers
1982 births
Living people
Olympiacos CFP (Superleague Formula team) drivers
Superleague Formula drivers
Italian Formula Three Championship drivers
Italian Formula Renault 2.0 drivers
BVM Target drivers